Adam Von Ahnen  Carse (19 May 1878 – 2 November 1958) was an English composer, academic, music writer and editor, remembered today for his studies on the history of instruments and the orchestra, and for his educational music. His collection of around 350 antique wind instruments is now in the Horniman Museum.

Education
Born in Newcastle upon Tyne, Carse received his first musical education in Hanover in 1893, and from 1894-1903 was a Macfarren scholar at the Royal Academy of Music, London where he studied composition with Frederick Corder. He received the 1902 medal from the Worshipful Company of Musicians, handed to the best student of the academy. He was assistant music master at Winchester College between 1909 and 1922, then returning to the Academy as Professor of Harmony and Counterpoint until 1940.

Composition 
According to Arthur Eaglefield Hull, Carse had "a pleasant and well finished style of writing, which concerns itself more with sound construction than original or atmospheric effects". Much of the material he wrote and arranged for school orchestras, young string players and pianists is still in use today. Among his educational piano works is the short Miniature Scherzo, which was chosen as one of ten test pieces for the Daily Express national piano playing competition in 1928, and recorded as a demonstration by William Murdoch.

Early orchestral works included a prelude to Byron's Manfred and two symphonic poems: The Death of Tintagiles (1902) and In a Balcony, (after Browning) the latter performed at the Proms on 26 August 1905. He wrote five symphonies, the second, in G minor, premiered by the orchestra of the Royal College of Music in London in November 1908 with the composer conducting, and the third (in F major, composed in 1927) was performed by the Bournemouth Municipal Orchestra on 20 April 1932 and broadcast from the Bournemouth Pavilion by the BBC.

His many works for strings included the Two Sketches of 1924, which were performed at the Proms on 4 September 1924, and the five movement Winton Suite of 1933, showing the influence of eighteenth century dance suites. Carse also wrote chamber music, including a Violin Sonata published in 1921 and the Miniature String Quartet in A minor, published in 1934. The seven Variations for Strings were composed as late as 1953 and broadcast by the BBC on 10 May 1954. For his compositions Carse occasionally used the name William Kent as an alias, and sometimes Adam Ahn-Carse.

Later life
During and after the war Carse concentrated on writing and editing. His books (described in The Musical Times as "of first rate importance") include Musical Wind Instruments (1939), The Orchestra in the 18th Century (1940) and The Orchestra from Beethoven to Berlioz (1948), as well as a biography of the composer, conductor and showman Louis-Antoine Jullien, who established a concert series that was a forerunner to the Henry Wood Proms. He also specialised in editing early classical symphonies by composers such as Carl Friedrich Abel, Thomas Arne, J C Bach, Gossec and Stamitz.

In February 1945 his son, Edward Adam Carse, was killed in action. Carse died in 1958 at his home - Winton, Martin's End Lane, Great Missenden, Buckinghamshire - aged eighty.

Books
 The History of Orchestration (1925)
 Musical Wind Instruments (1939)
 The Orchestra in the 18th Century (1940)
 The Orchestra from Beethoven to Berlioz (1948)
 18th Century Symphonies (1951)
 The Life of Jullien (1951)

Donation to the Horniman 
In 1947 he donated his collection of 350 wind instruments to the Horniman Museum in South London in memory of his son Edward Adam (Peter) Carse, and there is a plaque commemorating his gift in the Horniman Music Gallery. He dedicated his Fifth Symphony, written in June 1945, to the memory of his son.

Alongside the donated instruments is the personal library of Adam Carse, containing research papers, manuscript notes, copies of lectures, correspondence, makers catalogues, sales lists and concert programmes.

References

External links
 Adam Carse page at Stainer & Bell
 Adam Carse at the British Music Collection
 Horniman Museum and Gardens
 
 'A Northern Song' (the first of Two Sketches) played by the Northern Sinfonia, David Lloyd-Jones

English classical composers
English Romantic composers
1878 births
1958 deaths
Alumni of the Royal Academy of Music
English male classical composers
20th-century classical composers
Musicians from Newcastle upon Tyne
20th-century English composers
20th-century British male musicians
19th-century British male musicians